The 2017 Clásica de Almería was the 32nd edition of the Clásica de Almería road cycling one day race. It was part of the 2017 UCI Europe Tour, as a 1.1 categorised race.

In a sprint finish, Denmark's Magnus Cort won the race ahead of 's Rüdiger Selig, while the podium was completed by Jens Debusschere for the  team.

Teams
Seventeen teams were invited to take part in the race. These included six UCI WorldTeams, nine UCI Professional Continental teams and two UCI Continental teams.

Result

References

External links

2017
2017 UCI Europe Tour
2017 in Spanish road cycling